Chambonas is a commune in the Ardèche department in southern France.

Geography
The commune is traversed by the river Chassezac.

Population

See also
Communes of the Ardèche department

References

Communes of Ardèche
Ardèche communes articles needing translation from French Wikipedia